England v Germany (2000) was the final match to be played at the old Wembley Stadium. The match was a 2002 World Cup qualifying game between England and Germany. Germany won the game 1–0, with the goal scored by Dietmar Hamann. England manager Kevin Keegan resigned from his position after this game. The return fixture in Munich, Germany, resulted in a 5–1 victory to England with Swedish Sven-Göran Eriksson as new England manager.

Background
The game took place on 7 October 2000. The demolition of Wembley Stadium had already been announced. Prior to the game, England's team selection was leaked to the media, leading to criticism from Keegan.

Match

Team selection
Both England and Germany fielded 4–4–2 formations. England centre-back Gareth Southgate was unusually played in a defensive midfield position ahead of Paul Ince and Dennis Wise.

Summary
The only goal of the game was scored by Dietmar Hamann after fourteen minutes. It came from a free kick awarded for a foul on Michael Ballack by Paul Scholes 30 yards from goal. German goalkeeper Oliver Kahn saved shots from Andy Cole and England captain Tony Adams in the first half and a David Beckham free kick in the second. England's David Seaman, who some had blamed for the first goal, saved a shot by Mehmet Scholl on 52 minutes.

Details

Aftermath
Immediately after the game, Keegan resigned as manager of England. England under-21 coach Howard Wilkinson was appointed as caretaker manager by the Football Association. He was succeeded by Sven-Goran Eriksson, who led England to a 5–1 victory over Germany in the return fixture.

Dietmar Hamann's goal was the last to be scored at the stadium. Hamann later stated in an interview that he regretted the fact that Keegan had resigned after the game, as he had supported Hamburger SV during Keegan's time at the club.

In May 2005, a poll to name a footbridge at the new Wembley Stadium saw the name Dietmar Hamann Bridge receive the most nominations. It was instead given the name White Horse Bridge.

See also
 England–Germany football rivalry

References

External links
2007 BBC Sport interview with Dietmar Hamann about the game

2000
2000
England v Germany
Eng
Ger
Events at Wembley Stadium
2000 sports events in London
Eng
Ger
England–Germany football rivalry
England v Germany
2002 FIFA World Cup qualification (UEFA)